In algebraic topology, the cellular approximation theorem states that a map between CW-complexes can always be taken to be of a specific type. Concretely, if X and Y are CW-complexes, and f : X → Y is a continuous map, then f is said to be cellular, if f takes the n-skeleton of X to the n-skeleton of Y for all n, i.e. if  for all n. The content of the cellular approximation theorem is then that any continuous map f : X → Y between CW-complexes X and Y is homotopic to a cellular map, and if f is already cellular on a subcomplex A of X, then we can furthermore choose the homotopy to be stationary on A. From an algebraic topological viewpoint, any map between CW-complexes can thus be taken to be cellular.

Idea of proof 

The proof can be given by induction after n, with the statement that f is cellular on the skeleton Xn. For the base case n=0, notice that every path-component of Y must contain a 0-cell. The image under f of a 0-cell of X can thus be connected to a 0-cell of Y by a path, but this gives a homotopy from f to a map which is cellular on the 0-skeleton of X.

Assume inductively that f is cellular on the (n − 1)-skeleton of X, and let en  be an n-cell of X. The closure of en is compact in X, being the image of the characteristic map of the cell, and hence the image of the closure of en under f is also compact in Y. Then it is a general result of CW-complexes that any compact subspace of a CW-complex meets (that is, intersects non-trivially) only finitely many cells of the complex. Thus f(en) meets at most finitely many cells of Y, so we can take  to be a cell of highest dimension meeting f(en). If , the map f is already cellular on en, since in this case only cells of the n-skeleton of Y meets f(en), so we may assume that k > n. It is then a technical, non-trivial result (see Hatcher) that the restriction of f to  can be homotoped relative to Xn-1 to a map missing a point p ∈ ek. Since f(en) met only finitely many cells of Y to begin with, we can repeat this process finitely many times to make  miss all cells of Y of dimension larger than n.

We repeat this process for every n-cell of X, fixing cells of the subcomplex A on which f is already cellular, and we thus obtain a homotopy (relative to the (n − 1)-skeleton of X and the n-cells of A) of the restriction of f to Xn to a map cellular on all cells of X of dimension at most n. Using then the homotopy extension property to extend this to a homotopy on all of X, and patching these homotopies together, will finish the proof. For details, consult Hatcher.

Applications

Some homotopy groups 

The cellular approximation theorem can be used to immediately calculate some homotopy groups. That is, any such map is nullhomotopic.

Cellular approximation for pairs 

Let f:(X,A)→(Y,B) be a map of CW-pairs, that is, f is a map from X to Y, and the image of  under f sits inside B. Then f is homotopic to a cellular map (X,A)→(Y,B). To see this, restrict f to A and use cellular approximation to obtain a homotopy of f to a cellular map on A. Use the homotopy extension property to extend this homotopy to all of X, and apply cellular approximation again to obtain a map cellular on X, but without violating the cellular property on A.

As a consequence, we have that a CW-pair (X,A) is n-connected, if all cells of  have dimension strictly greater than n: If , then any map →(X,A) is homotopic to a cellular map of pairs, and since the n-skeleton of X sits inside A, any such map is homotopic to a map whose image is in A, and hence it is 0 in the relative homotopy group .
We have in particular that  is n-connected, so it follows from the long exact sequence of homotopy groups for the pair  that we have isomorphisms → for all  and a surjection →.

CW approximation 

For every space X one can construct a CW complex Z and a weak homotopy equivalence  that is called a CW approximation to X. CW approximation, being a weak homotopy equivalence, induces isomorphisms on homology and cohomology groups of X. Thus one often can use CW approximation to reduce a general statement to a simpler version that only concerns CW complexes.

 are attached by constant mappings and are mapped to X to generate  (or  ).

References 
 

Theorems in algebraic topology